List of the National Register of Historic Places listings in Tompkins County, New York

This is intended to be a complete list of properties and districts listed on the National Register of Historic Places in Tompkins County, New York.  The locations of National Register properties and districts (at least for all showing latitude and longitude coordinates below) may be seen in a map by clicking on "Map of all coordinates".  One property, Morrill Hall, is further designated a U.S. National Historic Landmark.



Current listings

|}

Former listing

|}

See also

National Register of Historic Places listings in New York

References

Tompkins County